The followling is an incomplete list of locomotives and multiple units used by the Swiss Federal Railways.

Steam locomotives

Steam railcars

Electric locomotives

Electric trainsets

Electric railcars

Diesel locomotives

Diesel trainsets

Battery-electric railcars

Heavy shunters

Light shunters

Notes
1 Designations have changed over time
2 Numbers have changed over time
3 Numbers not continuous
4 Changes within one series
5 Not used any more, not yet used, or defined, but never used
6 Details have changed over time, this is the latest information
7 Today Zentralbahn
8 Classic Rail sold four of these locomotives to MThB
9 These locomotives were bought by the SBB-CFF-FFS and leased to BLS Lötschbergbahn

Pictures of some of the locomotives and multiple units

Sources, further reading

See also
Swiss locomotive and railcar classification

Literature
Hartung, Karlheinz  Kleine Typenkunde Schweizer Triebfahrzeuge Transpress Verlag (German)

  
Swiss railway-related lists
Swiss Federal Railways